Dongshi may refer to

Chinese place name

Fujian
Dongshi, Fujian, town in Jinjiang

Guangdong
Dongshi, Guangdong (zh), town in Pingyuan County

Hubei
Dongshi, Hubei, town in Zhijiang

Sichuan
Dongshi Township, Sichuan (zh), subdivision of Zitong County

Taiwan
Dongshi, Taichung, Taichung
Dongshi, Chiayi, township in Chiayi County
Dongshi, Yunlin, township in Yunlin County